Pennaria is a genus of hydrozoans. It is the only genus within the monotypic family Pennariidae.

Species
The following species are included in the genus:
Pennaria armata Vanhöffen, 1911
Pennaria blistera Xu & Huang, 2006
Pennaria disticha Goldfuss, 1820
Pennaria grandis Kramp, 1928
Pennaria wilsoni Bale, 1913

References

Pennariidae
Hydrozoan genera